The 27th Legislative Assembly of Ontario was in session from September 25, 1963, until September 5, 1967, just prior to the 1967 general election. The majority party was the Ontario Progressive Conservative Party led by John Robarts.

Donald Hugo Morrow served as speaker for the assembly.

Notes

References 
Members in Parliament 27

Terms of the Legislative Assembly of Ontario
1963 establishments in Ontario
1967 disestablishments in Ontario